Kare is a surname. Notable people with the surname include:

 Jordin Kare (1956–2017), American aerospace engineer
 Morley Kare (1922–1990), Canadian scientist
 Ramnath Kare (born 1934), Indian businessman 
 Susan Kare (born 1954), American graphic designer

See also

Karey (disambiguation)
Karie (name)
Karre